Quán Sứ Pagoda or Ambassadors' Pagoda (Hán Nôm: 舘使寺) is a Buddhist temple located at 73 Quan Su Street, Hanoi, Vietnam. The temple is the headquarters of the Buddhist Sangha of Vietnam.

History
Quan Su Pagoda was built in the 15th century under the Lê dynasty. At that time there was no Buddhist temple here but some cottages used as a place of worship. According to Hoàng Lê nhất thống chí, during Emperor Le The Tong's reign, Chiem Thanh (Champa), Ai Lao (Laos) usually sent ambassadors to offer tributes to Đại Việt (official name of Viet Nam under the Lê dynasty). The Emperor ordered to construct a building called Quan Su (Embassy) to receive foreign ambassadors to Thăng Long. Because those ambassadors were all Buddhist, they decided to build a temple on the premises for worship. Today only the temple remains.

According to Doctor Le Duy Trung's essay carved on the 1855 stele, the temple was close to Hau Quan Base in the early years of Gia Long Era (1802–1819). In 1822, the temple was renovated so that the local residents could practise worship here. When the troops withdrew, the temple was returned to the villagers. Monk Thanh Phuong, who hosted the temple then, had corridors built, statues painted, bell made. The front palace is dedicated to the Buddha and the rear palace is dedicated to Master Minh Khong of the Lý dynasty.

See also
List of Buddhist temples in Hanoi
Buddhist temples in Hanoi

References

External links
 Buddhist temples in Vietnam
 Lotus Library
 Buddhist temples in Hanoi
 Giới thiệu Chùa Quán Sứ Hà Nội

Buddhist temples in Hanoi
15th-century establishments in Vietnam
15th-century Buddhist temples